The 2006 Tour de la Région Wallonne was the 33rd edition of the Tour de Wallonie cycle race and was held from 24 July to 28 July 2006. The race started in Flobecq and finished in Wanze. The race was won by Fabrizio Guidi.

General classification

References

Tour de Wallonie
Tour de la Région Wallonne